Lost Girls & Love Hotels is a 2020 American erotic thriller drama film directed by William Olsson from a screenplay by Catherine Hanrahan, based on Hanrahan's 2006 novel Lost Girls and Love Hotels. The film stars Alexandra Daddario as an American English teacher in Tokyo, who loses herself to the city's nightlife and begins an affair with a member of the Yakuza. It was released through video on demand on September 18, 2020, by Astrakan Film AB.

Plot
Margaret is an American expatriate living in Tokyo. She works at a Japanese flight academy during the day teaching prospective flight attendants how to pronounce English. She spends her nights getting drunk with fellow expatriates Ines and Liam and seeks out submissive sexual encounters with random men in the city's numerous love hotels. Her nightly misadventures cause her to show up to work in a daze and disheveled, drawing the concern of her instructor Nakamura.

One day, Margaret crosses paths with a Yakuza enforcer named Kazu and the two begin a relationship. Margaret is at first taken aback by Kazu's revelation that he is about to get married, but she gives in to him when he admits that his marriage is more out of duty than love. Margaret confides to Kazu that she does not have a family: her father left when she was a child, her mother died from cancer, and she has a schizophrenic brother; and that she came to Japan to be alone.

On the day of graduation for Margaret's students at the flight academy, Kazu asks Margaret to spend the entire day with him in Kyoto. Initially reluctant to skip graduation, Margaret agrees when he says he will not get another day and they take the train. He brings her to the Kiyomizu-dera temple and shows her the "Buddha's womb", a stone illuminated at the end of a pitch-black tunnel. Kazu explains the symbolism of being reborn reaching the stone and brought Margaret there hoping to help her let go of her trauma, but Margaret seems unaffected. On the train ride back to Tokyo, Kazu leaves the train while Margaret is asleep, leaving her despondent and desperate to find him when she wakes up. When she returns to work, she finds that she has been let go and replaced for skipping graduation.

Margaret spirals down further when Ines reveals to her that she is leaving Japan. Following numerous thankless sexual encounters, Margaret finally spots Kazu with his family by chance one day and follows him into a love hotel. Kazu reprimands Margaret for following him, telling her nothing can happen between them. When Margaret insists that she loves him, they have sex one more time before he sends her away, leaving him saddened and conflicted. When Margaret returns to her apartment to find an eviction notice, she desperately takes a job as a bar hostess for drunken businessmen, but finds herself uncomfortable and leaves without getting paid.

Now homeless and at rock bottom, Margaret runs into Liam's girlfriend Louise, who reveals that Liam had been deported. After sharing a drink with Louise, Margaret gets drunk and begins wandering around Tokyo aimlessly at night until she takes notice of a strange man following her and asks him to take her to a love hotel. She strips naked and lies on the bed where the stranger ties her up. When he suggests that he could kill her, she begs him to do it, but Kazu comes into the room to rescue her, having followed her. Grateful for being rescued, Margaret decides to start anew by leaving Tokyo. On the plane, Margaret notices Tamiko, one of her former students, as her flight attendant and they smile at each other while Tamiko demonstrates safety procedures. Margaret calls Kazu to tell him she now understands the symbolism of the "Buddha's womb" and finally feels reborn before saying goodbye for good.

Cast
 Alexandra Daddario as Margaret
 Takehiro Hira as Kazu
 Carice van Houten as Ines
 Andrew Rothney as Liam
 Misuzu Kanno as Nakamura
 Yasunari Takeshima as Used
 Kate Easton as Louise
 Haruka Imo as Tamiko

Production
In December 2009, it was announced that Kate Bosworth would produce and star in Lost Girls and Love Hotels, based on the 2006 novel by Catherine Hanrahan. Jean-Marc Vallee was tapped to direct and Nadia Conners wrote the adapted screenplay. However, the film never made it to production.

In October 2017, it was announced that Alexandra Daddario would star in a newly produced adaptation under the title I Am Not a Bird, which would later revert to its original title. Hanrahan was hired to adapt her own novel and William Olsson was hired to direct. The rest of the cast, including Carice van Houten and Takehiro Hira, was announced in November 2017.

Principal photography took place from October to December 2017 in Tokyo and Kyoto, Japan.

Release
On July 8, 2020, it was announced that the film would be released on September 4, 2020, under Astrakan Releasing, the newly created distribution arm of Astrakan Films AB, the production company run by director William Olsson and producer Lauren Mann. The first teaser trailer for the film was also released in conjunction with the announcement of the film's release date. The official trailer was released on August 13, 2020, with a new release date set on September 18. On October 5, 2020, the film was picked up international rights by Signature Entertainment in 2021.

Reception
The website's critics consensus reads: "While it's a well-acted and occasionally involving mood piece, Lost Girls & Love Hotels often dampens its erotic elements with listless ennui." Metacritic reports a score of 57 out of 100 based on seven critic reviews, indicating "mixed or average reviews".

References

External links
 
 
 
 

2020 films
2020 multilingual films
2020 thriller drama films
2020s American films
2020s English-language films
2020s erotic drama films
2020s erotic thriller films
2020s Japanese-language films
American erotic drama films
American erotic thriller films
American multilingual films
American thriller drama films
Films about educators
Films based on Canadian novels
Films set in Kyoto
Films set in Tokyo
Films shot in Kyoto Prefecture
Films shot in Tokyo
Japan in non-Japanese culture
Yakuza films